This article features a list of bands and musicians from Newcastle upon Tyne, and may also include some bands and musicians from the wider Tyneside conurbation.

Alex Kapranos of Franz Ferdinand (partly raised in South Shields)
Andy Taylor of Duran Duran (from Cullercoats)
Angelic Upstarts
The Animals
Ant & Dec
Atomkraft, Thrash metal
Brian Johnson of AC/DC and Geordie (from Dunston, Gateshead)
Bridie Jackson and the Arbour, winner of the Glastonbury Festival Emerging Talent Competition 2013
Bryan Ferry of Roxy Music was born in Washington, County Durham but attended school in Newcastle and is a fan of Newcastle United
Bruce Welch of The Shadows
Ceramic
Cheryl of Girls Aloud
Chris McCormack from 3 Colours Red
Demob Happy
Dire Straits
Drill
Dubstar (from Jesmond)
Eric Burdon
The Forcefield Kids
Friends Of Harry
Geordie
Goldie
Hank Marvin of The Shadows
Hellbastard
Hurrah!
Jade Thirlwall of Little Mix
James Ray
Joe McElderry, winner of The X Factor UK series 6
Jimmy Nail
Kathryn Williams (originally from Liverpool), she is now based in Newcastle after studying at the University of Newcastle.
Lanterns on the Lake
The Lighthouse Family
Lindisfarne
Little Comets
Mark Knopfler guitarist, singer, and founder member of "Dire Straits". Although born in Glasgow, Mark & his family moved back to Northumberland when he was young and he attended school in Newcastle.
Matthew Healy of the alternative rock band The 1975. Although born in London, was brought up in Prudhoe
Maxïmo Park
The Motorettes
Nadine Shah
Neil Tennant of the Pet Shop Boys (born in North Shields, schooled in Newcastle)
The Orange Lights
Peace Burial at Sea
Penetration
Perrie Edwards of Little Mix 
Phase, switched their base to Newcastle in 2013.
Prefab Sprout
Punishment of Luxury
Raven
Richard Dawson
Rival Savages
Sam Fender
Sandhill Newcastle based band
Satan
Sharks Took the Rest
Sirens
Spike
Sting
Toy Dolls
Tygers of Pan Tang
Venom
Warfare
The Whodlums - a Who tribute band
The Wildhearts
YFriday
yourcodenameis:milo
Zoviet France

References

 
Bands